Kulbakino  is an air base of the Ukrainian Air Force located near Mykolaiv, Mykolaiv Oblast, Ukraine.

The base is home to the 299th Tactical Aviation Brigade flying Sukhoi Su-24M, Sukhoi Su-25, Aero L-39C Albatros and Aero L-39M aircraft.

Aircraft
Accroding to Google Earth Imagery, as of August 19, 2019
 5 Su-24
 18 Su-25
 16 MiG-29
 4 L-39 Albatros

References

Buildings and structures in Mykolaiv Oblast
Ukrainian airbases